Joseph Jean-Noël Yves Picard (December 25, 1938 – September 6, 2017) was a Canadian ice hockey defenceman who played in the National Hockey League (NHL) from 1965 to 1973.

Playing career

Picard started his NHL career with the Montreal Canadiens in 1965. He later played for the St. Louis Blues and Atlanta Flames. Picard retired after the 1973 season, winning one Stanley Cup with Montreal in 1965. He is noted for tripping Bobby Orr of the Boston Bruins after Orr scored the series-winning goal of the 1970 Stanley Cup Finals, sending a jumping Orr flying through the air with his arms raised in celebration. This image stands as one of the most famous action shots in North American sports history.

Personal life
Picard was a broadcaster for Blues games after he retired. He purchased Midway, a restaurant in Cuba, Missouri, in 1976 and later sold. He returned to Montreal, where he died in 2017.

Picard had two children with his wife Viviane who were raised in the St. Louis area; a daughter Annie in Chicago, and son Dan (who lives in New Baden, Illinois). Picard was the younger brother of Roger Picard, whom he briefly played with in St. Louis for one season.

Career statistics

Regular season and playoffs

References

External links
 

1938 births
2017 deaths
Atlanta Flames players
Canadian ice hockey defencemen
French Quebecers
Houston Apollos players
Ice hockey people from Montreal
Jersey Larks players
Montreal Canadiens players
Omaha Knights (CHL) players
Peterborough Petes (ice hockey) players
Providence Reds players
St. Louis Blues announcers
St. Louis Blues players
Seattle Totems (WHL) players
Stanley Cup champions